
Notable people named Kotani include:

A 
 Arisa Kotani (born 2000), Japanese curler

E 
 Eric Kotani, pseudonym of the Japanese-born American astrophysicist Yoji Kondo (1933-2017) who also wrote science fiction

H 
 Henry Kotani (1887-1972), Japanese film director and cinematographer
 Hiroki Kotani (born 1971),  Japanese mixed martial artist
 Hiroki Kotani (born 1993),  Japanese football player

K 
 Kengo Kotani (born 1992),  Japanese football player for Giravanz Kitakyushu
 Kenzō Kotani (1909-2003), the last Yasukuni Shrine swordsmith
 Kinya Kotani (born 1979), singer and actor from Saitama Prefecture, Japan

M 
 Mari Kotani (born 1958), Japanese science fiction critic and author
 Masao Kotani (1906-1993), Japanese theoretical physicist, known for molecular physics and biophysics
 Mikako Kotani (born 1966),  Japanese former synchronized swimmer who competed in the 1988 Summer Olympics
 Motoko Kotani (born 1960), Japanese mathematician

N 
 Naoyuki Kotani (born 1981), Japanese mixed martial artist

O 
 Ozzie Kotani, slack-key guitar player

R 
 Roland Kotani, Democratic member of the Hawaii State House of Representatives

S 
 Sumiyuki Kotani (1903-1991), Japanese martial artist

T 
 Toshiyuki Kotani, also known as styleos, is a Japanese video game illustrator and character designer

Y 
 Yasuko Kotani (born 1962), Japanese photographer 
 Yoshikazu Kotani (born 1982), Japanese actor and singer
 Yuki Kotani (born 1991), Japanese football player
 Yuna Kotani (born 1998), Japanese curler
 Yuriko Kotani, UK-based Japanese comedian

See also
 Kottani, a settlement in the municipality Myki in the Xanthi regional unit of Greece